DiPino (or di Pino) is a surname of Italian origin. Notable people with this surname include:

Marco di Pino, also known as Marco Pino or Marco da Siena (1521–1583), an Italian painter of the Renaissance and Mannerist period

Bernadette DiPino, an American law enforcement officer
Frank Michael DiPino (born 1956), an American professional baseball pitcher

Italian-language surnames